William Astley (13 August 1855 – 5 October 1911) was an Australian short-story writer who wrote under the pseudonym "Price Warung".

Astley was the second son of Captain Thomas Astley, a jeweller, and his wife Mary née Price. He was born in Liverpool, England, and was brought to Australia with his family in November 1859. The family settled in Richmond, a suburb of Melbourne and William was educated at St Stephen's school and the Melbourne model school.

Astley obtained work in booksellers' shops. It has often been repeated that he was editor of the Richmond Guardian for a short period when only 21 years of age, but the Richmond Guardian's 1911 obituary of Astley makes no mention of any association of his with the paper. He was subsequently connected with the Echuca Riverine Herald and other Victorian journals, the Launceston Daily Telegraph, the Workman, the Worker (Sydney), the Tumut Independent and the Bathurst Free Press. While at Bathurst, New South Wales he was secretary of the Bathurst Federal League, which did useful work for federation. He had regular correspondence with Sir Henry Parkes, Edmund Barton and George Black. During the 1880s and 1890s Astley did some free-lance work for The Bulletin in which four series of his stories of the convict days were published.

The first collection of these, Tales of the Convict System, appeared in 1892; this was followed by Tales of the Early Days (1894), Tales of the Old Regime (1897), Tales of the Isle of Death (1898), and Half-Crown Bob and Tales of the Riverine (1898).

Astley married Louisa Frances Cope of Launceston, Tasmania on 22 September 1884. He had had a nervous breakdown in 1878, and in his last years there were recurrences of mental trouble. He died at Rookwood Benevolent Asylum, Sydney on 5 October 1911.  
 
Astley was an excellent journalist and short story writer. He had made a study of early Australian history and took great care with his stories. There is a degree of starkness about his work, but his tales are full of human nature and human pity. He must be ranked among the best writers of Australian short stories.

A.G. Stephens, the literary critic, described Astley as a "sad rogue". In 1881 Astley had been charged in Hobart with embezzling 60 pounds, and eventually sentenced to two years imprisonment. In 1897 he attempted to extort money from the publishers Angus and Robertson, and is strongly implicated in the successful defrauding of the book collector David Scott Mitchell of 125 pounds by means of the sale of non-existent Australiana.

References 

 B. G. Andrews, 'Astley, William (Price Warung) (1855–1911)', Australian Dictionary of Biography, Volume 3, MUP, 1969, pp 56–57. 
 
 The Daily Telegraph, Sydney, 7 October 1911
 The Bulletin, 12 October 1911 
 E. Morris Miller, Australian Literature

1855 births
1911 deaths
Australian male short story writers
Australian federationists
People from Melbourne
English emigrants to Australia
Novelists from Liverpool
Journalists from Liverpool
19th-century Australian journalists
19th-century Australian male writers
19th-century Australian short story writers
Australian male journalists